Thomas Maslin House, also known as Mortimer Gamble House and Maslin-Gamble House, is a historic home located at Moorefield, Hardy County, West Virginia. It was built in 1848, and is a two-story brick dwelling with a vernacular Federal style.  It features a single-bay, pedimented portico supported by paired Ionic order columns.  Above the four panel entrance is a semi-elliptical fanlight.  Also on the property is a contributing two story, brick servant's quarters.

It was listed on the National Register of Historic Places in 1979.

References

Houses on the National Register of Historic Places in West Virginia
Federal architecture in West Virginia
Houses completed in 1848
Houses in Hardy County, West Virginia
Vernacular architecture in West Virginia
National Register of Historic Places in Hardy County, West Virginia
1848 establishments in Virginia
Historic district contributing properties in West Virginia